Álvaro Martín de Frías (born 15 January 2001) is a Spanish footballer who plays as a midfielder for Real Madrid Castilla.

Club career
Born in Madrid, Martín first joined Real Madrid's La Fábrica in 2012, from Getafe. Released in 2016, he spent a year at Rayo Vallecano before returning to Los Blancos in 2017.

On 1 October 2020, after finishing his formation, Martín was loaned to Prva HNL side Šibenik, for one year. He made his professional debut two days later, coming on as a second-half substitute for Emir Sahiti in a 0–2 home loss against Osijek.

Career statistics

Club
.

Honours 
Real Madrid
UEFA Youth League: 2019–20

References

External links
Real Madrid profile

2001 births
Living people
Spanish footballers
Footballers from the Community of Madrid
Association football midfielders
Real Madrid Castilla footballers
Croatian Football League players
HNK Šibenik players
Spanish expatriate footballers
Spanish expatriate sportspeople in Croatia
Expatriate footballers in Croatia